Nay Win (born 25 April 1987) is a Burmese rapper, singer and songwriter. He is considered one of the most commercially successful hip hop singers in Burmese music scene and has jokingly referred to himself as the "Godfather of Myanmar Hip Hop" because of his clothing brand OMG (Oh My Godfather).

Early life and education
Nay Win was born on 25 April 1987 in Kyauk Myaung, Yangon, Myanmar. His father is a painter. He is the second son of four siblings, having an elder brother, a younger sister and a younger brother. He graduated high school from Basic Education High School No. 1 Dagon.

Music career

2000–2005: Snare/G Family/Hip Hop Vibration
Nay Win started out on his music career in 2000, as a founding member of Snare, a native underground hip hop band, established with his school friend Sithu Phay Myint. They were soon joined by their friends Phyo Lay and Set Paing Soe as well as Nay Win's cousin Aung Thu. Their first unofficial album was recorded in 2001 under a limited budget that allowed for only 40 copies. By the year 2000 the musical genre of hip hop had already captured the attention of Yangon youth, primarily through the music of bands such as Acid who led the way for American style hip hop in Myanmar. Nay Win was quick to notice the trend, taking the music of his favourite artists and expanding upon them.

Around 2003/2004 the producers of their second album were arrested for reasons Nay Win prefers not to divulge. As a result the album remained unfinished and the vocalist Aung Thu left the band due to personal reasons. While not completely disbanding Snare entered the slow lane. In 2003, he joined a hip hop group G Family as a founding member and released a lot of songs and mix-tapes, collaborating with G Family's members. In 2004, he established a hip hop group, Hip Hop Vibration along with hip hop artists Naing Win, May Moe and Moe Thae. Hip Hop Vibration debuted a solo album called "Hip Hop Vibration Pya Htan Chat" in 2005 and distributed a VCD.

2006–2010: Breakthrough and signed with Frenzo
In 2006, the four remaining members of Snare got back together to work on a new set of songs at Sithu's home studio and released the new songs in the same year. Snare were back in the groove despite the fact that Sithu and Phaing Soe had moved on to other projects in 2008. Nay Win and Phyoe Lay, the only two members left from the original line-up.  In 2010, Nay Win started working with Frenzo Production, a major music production company in Myanmar and owned by Sai Sai Kham Leng. Since them, he started entertaining in many concerts at various locations throughout Myanmar and Sai Sai Kham Leng's birthday show every year.

Late 2010–2018: Snare hits and nationwide recognition

In the late 2010, Nay Win and Phyo Lay released Snare's first album "Rap Game" and the follow-up second album "Ba Gyi Phyo and U Nay Win" was released in 2013. One of the songs of Snare, "Danger" song which became widely popular and that song has been one of the all-time hits in his career. Two-members left Snare had also staged successful live shows such as a solo performance "Snare Show 2014" in Mhyaw Sin Kyun, Kandawgyi Park in Yangon on November 16, 2014. Snare won the "Best Rap Music Award" and "Best Rap music, song and best album of the year" at the 2014 Myanmar Music Award (MMA). He went to Singapore to entertain in 2014 and 2015, respectively with Frenzo Production program; and he also travelled and entertained in Australia and the USA in 2015.

The third album "Puu Twal Champion", was released on 12 February 2018. Snare have successfully released three rap albums. These three albums were commercial success and placed the top of the albums chart in local since its released time which turned out to be a success creating him a place to stand in Myanmar music industry. Nay Win had found success not only as part of Snare but also by being the lyricist behind successful songs from other artists such as Sai Sai Kham Leng, Kyar Pauk, Saw Nyi Nyi, Bunny Phyoe, G Fatt, Eint Chit, Amera Hpone and more.

Late 2018–present: Solo debut and mainstream success
Nay Win started endeavoring to be able to produce and distribute a solo album. He launched his debut solo album "Swe Myo Par Mae" on 1 December 2018 which spawned more huge hits and became number 1 on the best-selling albums of the year. Many received the album very well as it was filled with Nay Win's personal style and feel to songs composed regarding a variety of issues concerning the youth.

On 1 April 2019,  Frenzo released an animation music video for "Nga Yee Zar Ka Po Mite Tal" (My girlfriend is better than yours) collaborating with Frenzo artists Nay Win, Sai Sai Kham Leng, Phyo Lay, Bunny Phyoe, Ki Ki Kyaw Zaw, John and G Fatt, which is one of the tracks in Sai Sai Kham Leng's album "Sai Sai is Sai Sai", was released on 1 April 2018. The music video became widely popular since the day released it on Sai Sai Kham Leng's official Facebook page and YouTube channel, and was praised for the animation quality and music video created by Pencell Studio. That music video was earned 1 M views within 24 hours and then 2 M views in 7 days.

Business
In 2013, Nay Win broadened his business and creative interests with the opening of ‘Oh My Godfather’ (OMG), a fashion design and retail outlet where Nay Win plays a hand in designing new lines of clothing.

Personal life
Nay Win is in a relationship with prominent travel blogger Travel Kueen since 2009.

Discography

Group albums
Hip Hop Vibration Pya Htan Chat (2005)

Duo albums (Snare) 
Rap Game (2010)
Ba Gyi Phyo and U Nay Win (2013)
Puu Twal Champion (2018)

Solo albums 
 Swe Myo Par Mae (2018)

Collaboration albums 
A Thit Kyite Thu Myar (အသစ်ကြိုက်သူများ) 
Pyaw Sa Yar Gyi (ပျော်စရာကြီး)
Lat Lat Ko Hta Lo 1/2  (လက်လက်ကိုထလို့ ၁/၂)
Mone Tal  (မုန်းတယ်)
Solo Live 
Cheere
Min A Twat 3 (မင်းအတွက် ၃)
Eain Ma Paing Yin Gawli Ma Lok Nae (အိမ်မပိုင်ရင်ဂေါ်လီမလုပ်နဲ့)
Cherry Oo 13 Anniversary
Aww Luu Tway (ဪလူတွေ)
Yote Pouk Nay Pi (ရုပ်ပေါက်နေပြီ)
New Age 
Gin (ဂျင်)
A Mhar Nae Ma Kin Tat Luu  (အမှားနဲ့မကင်းတဲ့လူ)
 120/B 
Bar Tway Pyit  (ဘာတွေဖြစ်)
Sai Sai is Sai Sai (စိုင်းစိုင်းကစိုင်းစိုင်း)
 9 Night Birthday 
Shock (ရှော့)
Khar Cha Nay Ya Tal  (ခါခြနေရတယ်)
Gar (ဂါ)

Tours

2004: Snare Show
2010–present: Concerts held every year on 10 April for Sai Sai Birthday

References

External links

1987 births
21st-century Burmese male actors
21st-century Burmese male singers
Burmese singer-songwriters
Male rappers
Burmese rappers
People from Yangon
Living people